The rayaditos (Aphrastura) are a genus of birds in the Furnariidae, the ovenbird family.

Taxonomy
The genus Aphrastura was introduced in 1899 by the American ornithologist Harry C. Oberholser with the thorn-tailed rayadito as the type species. The name genus name combines the Ancient Greek aphrastos meaning "marvellous" with oura meaning "tail".

The genus contains the following species:
 Thorn-tailed rayadito, Aphrastura spinicauda
 Masafuera rayadito, Aphrastura masafuerae

References

 
Bird genera
Taxa named by Harry C. Oberholser
Taxonomy articles created by Polbot